Major-General Lennox Alexander Hawkins Napier  (28 June 1928 – 21 July 2020) was a British Army officer.

Military career
Educated at Radley College and the Royal Military Academy Sandhurst, Napier was commissioned into the South Wales Borderers in 1946. He saw action in Malaya and was recognised with the award of the Military Cross in December 1957 during the Malayan Emergency. He became commanding officer of the 1st Battalion South Wales Borderers in 1967 and commanding officer of the 1st Battalion Royal Regiment of Wales in 1969. He went on to be commander of the Berlin Infantry Brigade in 1974, Divisional Brigadier for the Prince of Wales' Division in 1976 and General Officer Commanding Wales in 1980 before retiring in 1983.

In 1959 he married Jennifer Dawn Wilson; they had one son and two daughters. In retirement he was chairman of the Central Rail Users' Consultative Committee.

He died on 21 July 2020 at the age of 92.

References

 

British Army major generals
British Army personnel of the Malayan Emergency
Companions of the Order of the Bath
Officers of the Order of the British Empire
Recipients of the Military Cross
Deputy Lieutenants of Gwent
High Sheriffs of Gwent
South Wales Borderers officers
Royal Regiment of Wales officers
1928 births
2020 deaths